"Walk It Talk It" is a song by American hip hop trio Migos featuring Canadian rapper Drake. The single was released on March 18, 2018. It was included on the trio's third studio album, Culture II (2018). After the album's release, it debuted at number 18 and later peaked at number 10 on the Billboard Hot 100 after its release as the third single. The song was produced by frequent collaborators OG Parker and Deko.

Background
The song is the sixth track on Migos' third studio album Culture II, which was released in January 2018. It has become one of the more popular songs on the album, being the third-highest charting of all the songs, following "Stir Fry", which peaked at number eight on the Hot 100, and "MotorSport", which reached number six. American pop star Britney Spears, used elements of the song in a remix of her hit-single "I'm A Slave 4 U" during her Piece of Me Tour.

Music video
The music video, directed by Daps and Quavo, debuted on Migos' official Vevo channel on March 18, 2018. The video features guest appearances from Jamie Foxx and labelmate Lil Yachty. In the video, the trio and Drake perform on a fictional dance-themed show called Culture Ride (inspired by Soul Train), with Jamie Foxx playing fictional host Ron Delirious (based on the late Soul Train host Don Cornelius). In an interview conducted by Genius, Daps said that the whole video was shot on Beta Tape, which is why the highest quality is 480p on YouTube.

Lawsuit

In October 2018, the group was sued by rapper M.O.S, who claimed that the song is similar to his 2007 song "Walk it Like I Talk it." The lawsuit was later dismissed.

Charts

Weekly charts

Year-end charts

Certifications

Release history

References

2018 songs
2018 singles
Funk songs
Migos songs
Songs written by Quavo
Songs written by Offset (rapper)
Songs written by Takeoff (rapper)
Songs written by Drake (musician)
Songs written by OG Parker
Motown singles
Capitol Records singles
Drake (musician) songs